TagPay is a digital banking platform created by a French company TagPay. The software is used by banks, telecom operators, and other players to offer digital financial services to their clients.

TagPay uses sound-based Near Sound Data Transfer (NSDT) technology to secure electronic transactions. TagPay's target markets are in emerging economies.

Applications 
TagPay can be used by smart phones and supports a variety of mobile money services.

As of 2021, over 30 digital financial service providers use the TagPay platform to offer their customers financial services through their mobile phones.

References 

Mobile payments